Soyuz TM-18 was launched from Baikonur Cosmodrome and landed 112 km north of Arkalyk. TM-18 was a two-day solo flight that docked with the Mir space station on January 10, 1994. The three cosmonauts became the 15th resident crew on board Mir. The crew did research work in space flight medicine, primarily by cosmonaut Valeri Polyakov during his long-term flight, and accomplished 25 different experiments.

Crew

Mission highlights

18th expedition to Mir.

Afanasyev and Usachev spent 179 days on Mir. Dr. Polyakov was slated to
return to Earth on Soyuz-TM 20 in March 1995, after more than 420 days on
Mir.

See also

Timeline of longest spaceflights

References

 Spacefacts.de: Soyuz TM-18

Crewed Soyuz missions
Spacecraft launched in 1994